5th Queens was an electoral district in the Canadian province of Prince Edward Island, which elected two members to the Legislative Assembly of Prince Edward Island from 1873 to 1993. The district was also known as Charlottetown Common until 1939.

Until 1966, the district comprised the entire city of Charlottetown. For that year's provincial election, the district was split, and 5th Queens comprised the eastern half of the city for the remainder of its existence. The western half of Charlottetown became the new district of 6th Queens.

The district was abolished in 1996 into Charlottetown-Kings Square, Parkdale-Belvedere, Sherwood-Hillsborough and Stanhope-East Royalty.

Members

Dual member

Assemblyman-Councillor

Election results

1993

Councillor

Assemblyman

1989

Councillor

Assemblyman

1986

Councillor

Assemblyman

1982

Councillor

Assemblyman

References

Queens 5
1873 establishments in Prince Edward Island
1996 disestablishments in Prince Edward Island
Constituencies established in 1873
Constituencies disestablished in 1996